Sjödin is a Swedish surname. Notable people with the surname include:

Agneta Sjödin (born 1967), Swedish TV host
Anna Sjödin (born 1976), Swedish politician
Dru Sjodin (1981–2003), American murder victim
Jenny Sjödin (born Anna Jenny Thunell) (born 1985), Swedish wrestler
Jimmy Sjödin (born 1977), Swedish Olympic diver
Karin Sjödin (born 1983), Swedish golfer
Simon Sjödin (born 1986), Swedish Olympic swimmer
Tommy Sjödin (born 1965), retired Swedish ice hockey player

References

See also 
 Sjölin

Swedish-language surnames